Scott Tyler may refer to:

Scott Tyler (The Power of Five)
Scott Tyler, character in Across the Continent
Scott Tyler (American football), see Indianapolis Colts draft history
Scott Tyler (baseball), see History of the Miami Marlins